An election to Limerick County Council took place on 5 June 2009 as part of that year's Irish local elections. 28 councillors were elected from five electoral divisions by PR-STV voting for a five-year term of office.

Results by party

Results by electoral area

Adare

Castleconnell

Kilmallock

Newcastle West

Rathkeale

References

External links

2009 Irish local elections
2009